Esmailabad-e Moin (also Romanized as Esma‘īlābād-e Mo‘īn; also known as Esma‘īlābād) is a village in Kahrizak Rural District, Kahrizak District, Ray County, Tehran Province, Iran. At the 2006 census, its population was 1,341, in 332 families.

References 

Populated places in Ray County, Iran